is a Japanese video game designer and producer who works for Nintendo. Sugiyama joined the company in 1983, and served as one of the original young design staff for Nintendo's creative department. Sugiyama contributed graphic design to several games and worked with several notable Nintendo staff, including Mario series creator Shigeru Miyamoto and former president Satoru Iwata. Sugiyama originally worked as a graphic designer and character artist on several early Famicom titles. One of his early famous creations were the character designs of Popo and Nana from Ice Climber. Sugiyama went on to co-direct Zelda II: The Adventure of Link. Sugiyama was also one of the central designers working on Miyamoto's GBA-GCN Connectivity experiments, most of which never saw release.

Works

Interviews
Iwata Asks: Wii Fit - Development Staff Interview

References

1959 births
Japanese video game designers
Japanese video game directors
Japanese video game producers
Living people
Nintendo people
Osaka University of Arts alumni
People from Shizuoka Prefecture